This was the first edition of the tournament.

Luis David Martínez and Cristian Rodríguez won the title after defeating Grigoriy Lomakin and Oleg Prihodko 7–6(7–2), 7–6(7–3) in the final.

Seeds

Draw

References

External links
 Main draw

Pereira Challenger - Doubles